

Olivier Levasseur (1688, 1689, or 1690 – 7 July 1730), was a French pirate, nicknamed La Buse ("The Buzzard") or La Bouche ("The Mouth") in his early days for the speed and ruthlessness with which he always attacked his enemies as well as his ability to verbally attack his opponents. He is known for allegedly hiding one of the biggest treasures in pirate history, estimated at over £1 billion, and leaving a cryptogram behind with clues to its whereabouts.

Biography
Born at Calais during the Nine Years' War (1688–1697) to a wealthy bourgeois family, Levasseur became an architect after receiving an excellent education. During the War of the Spanish Succession (1701–1714), he procured a letter of marque from King Louis XIV and became a privateer for the French crown. When the war ended he was ordered to return home with his ship, but he instead joined the pirate company of Benjamin Hornigold in 1716. Though he already had a scar across one eye limiting his sight, Levasseur proved himself a good leader and shipmate.

After a year of successful looting, the Hornigold party split, Levasseur partnering briefly with Samuel Bellamy before deciding to try his luck on the Brazilian Coast aboard a stolen 22-gun merchant frigate named La Louise. He attacked many boats and ships on his way to the south of Brazil, most notably a slave ship coming from Angola, whose crew was abandoned to sink in their ship after it was robbed and damaged. He then abandoned 240 stolen slaves on an island off Macae (next to Rio de Janeiro) before a Portuguese armed boat gave him chase. After skirmishes with the Portuguese at Ilha Grande and Ubatuba, where ten pirates were killed, La Louise took shelter in Cananeia for some days. There Levasseur was informed of a rich French merchantman in the nearby bay of Paranaguá. While giving it chase, La Louise was caught in a storm off Cotinga Island and sank on 9 March 1718, with the death of about 80 of its crew. Levasseur escaped on a small brigantine that escorted his ship, and from there went south to Sao Francisco do Sul, where he robbed a boat full of cassava flour, in order to feed his surviving crew, sailing back to Cananeia.

The pirates then sailed further north preying on ships again. Levasseur later reappeared in the Caribbean in June of that year in a smaller vessel that he had managed to steal on his way back from Brazil, but was almost captured by  under the command of Captain Hume, and fled with much of his valuables to the Caribbean area in a smaller sloop. He later joined his former associates. After William Moody was ejected from command by his disgruntled crew in late 1718, they elected Levasseur as captain in Moody's place. In 1719, he operated together with Howell Davis and Thomas Cocklyn (who had also served under Moody) for a time. In 1720, they attacked the slaver port of Ouidah, Kingdom of Whydah (on the coast of what is now Benin), reducing the local fortress to ruins. Later that year, he was shipwrecked in the Mozambique Channel and stranded on the island of Anjouan in the Comoros. His bad eye had become completely blind by now, so he started wearing an eyepatch.

From 1720 onwards, Levasseur launched his raids from a base on the island of Sainte-Marie, just off the coast of Madagascar, together with pirates John Taylor, Jasper Seagar, and Edward England. The Great Mughal's heavily armed but also heavily laden pilgrim ships to Mecca sailed these seas. Levasseur's quartermaster at this time was Paulsgrave Williams, who had been Bellamy's quartermaster and fellow captain until Bellamy was killed in a storm off Cape Cod. They first plundered the Laccadives, and sold the loot to Dutch traders for £75,000. Levasseur and Taylor eventually got tired of England's humanity and marooned him on the island of Mauritius.

They then perpetrated one of piracy's greatest exploits: the capture of the Portuguese great galleon Nossa Senhora do Cabo (Our Lady of the Cape) or Virgem Do Cabo (The Virgin of the Cape), which was loaded full of treasures belonging to the Bishop of Goa, also called the Patriarch of the East Indies, and the Viceroy of Portugal, who were both on board returning home to Lisbon. The pirates were able to board the vessel without firing a single broadside because the Cabo had been damaged in a storm; to avoid capsizing the crew had dumped all 72 cannons overboard, then anchored off Réunion island to undergo repairs. (This incident would later be used by Robert Louis Stevenson in his novel Treasure Island, in which the galleon is referred to as The Viceroy of the Indies in the account given by his famed fictional character Long John Silver.)

The booty consisted of bars of gold and silver, dozens of boxes full of golden Guineas, diamonds, pearls, silk, art, and religious objects from the Se Cathedral in Goa, including the Fiery Cross of Goa, made of pure gold and inlaid with diamonds, rubies, and emeralds. It was so heavy that it required three men to carry it to Levasseur's ship. In fact, the treasure was so huge that the pirates did not bother to rob the persons of the ship's passengers, something they normally would have done.

When the loot was divided, each pirate received at least £50,000 worth of golden Guineas, as well as 42 diamonds each. Seagar died when they sailed to Madagascar to divide their take; Levasseur and Taylor split the remaining gold, silver, and other objects, with Levasseur taking the golden cross.

In 1724, Levasseur sent a negotiator to the governor on the island of Bourbon (present-day Réunion) to discuss an amnesty that had been offered to all pirates in the Indian Ocean who would give up their practice. However, the French government wanted a large part of the stolen loot back, so Levasseur decided to avoid the amnesty and settled down in secret on the Seychelles archipelago. Eventually he was captured near Fort Dauphin, Madagascar. He was then taken to Saint-Denis, Réunion, and hanged for piracy at 5PM on 7 July 1730.

The treasure

Legend tells that when he stood on the scaffold to be hanged, Levasseur wore a necklace containing a cryptogram of 17 lines, and threw this into the crowd while exclaiming: "Find my treasure, the one who may understand it!" The necklace has been lost, but treasure hunters have since tried to decode the cryptogram, hoping its solution will lead to a treasure.

In 1947, Englishman Reginald Cruise-Wilkins studied the documents, but the cryptogram was much more difficult to solve than first believed. Cruise-Wilkins' early writing indicates that the code may be based on Masonic symbolism. Cruise-Wilkins claimed to have discovered a connection with the Zodiac, the Clavicles of Solomon, and the Twelve Labours of Hercules. Various tasks, representing the Labours of Hercules, had to be undertaken in strict order. The treasure chamber is somewhere underground and must be approached carefully, to avoid being flooded. It is protected by the tides, which requires damming to hold them back, and is to be approached from the north.

Until his death at Réunion, Cruise-Wilkins sought and dug in the island of Mahé. In a cave, except for old guns, some coins, and pirate sarcophagi, he did not find anything. He died on 3 May 1977 before he broke the last piece of code. His son, Seychellois history teacher John, is currently still seeking the treasure, concluding that after using state-of-the-art equipment, he needs "to go back to the old method, [getting] into this guy's mind, [claiming he is] ten down, two to go in his Herculean Labours."

Transcription of the cryptogram

Popular culture
Basil Rathbone plays Levasseur in the 1935 Errol Flynn film Captain Blood.
The story of Levasseur's treasure was featured in the comic book series Spike and Suzy (also known in the UK as Bob & Bobette or the original names Suske en Wiske by the Flemish author Willy Vandersteen), in the album The Amazing Coconut (1990). There the medallion of Levasseur was taken by a bird, which fled into the forest, where it became trapped in a mature fruit called coco de mer. This coconut was sold in Belgium in 1988 to the heroes of the series, and they went on to discover the medallion and finally the treasure.
The 28th episode of Redbeard features the fictitious daughter of the historical pirate Olivier Levasseur.
In the Japanese anime and manga series One Piece, the main storyline is ignited by the deceased pirate Gol D. Roger, who, much like Levasseur, during his public execution dared the assembled people to find his hidden treasure called "One Piece", assuring them that he had left everything he owned in one place.
In the mobile game Assassin's Creed: Pirates, the Templar-fronted corporation Abstergo Industries wants to find La Buse's treasure. To this end, they hire the player, a genetic memory researcher, to delve into the memories of the pirate Alonzo Batilla, whom La Buse befriended before becoming a legend. His treasure contains a Piece of Eden, one of numerous artifacts left behind by the First Civilization, humanity's precursors.
The travel book The Age of Kali by William Dalrymple devotes a chapter to Levasseur and the people's local belief in the spiritual power associated with his grave in Saint-Denis.
The Amazon Prime Video series The Grand Tour features La Buse's treasure in season 4 episode 2 "A Massive Hunt".  The episode ends with Jeremy Clarkson, Richard Hammond and James May failing to find the treasure - but discovering the Holy Grail instead.

See also
List of pirates

Sources
Treasure Islands, Cameron platt & John Wright, London, O'Mara books, 1992. 
Pirates!: Brigands, Buccaneers, and Privateers in Fact, fiction, and Legend, Jan Rogozinski, New York: Da Capo Press, 1996. 
 Under the Black Flag: Exploits of the Most Notorious Pirates, Don Carlos Seitz, Mineola, NY: Courier Dover Publications, 2002. 
 Erik A. Dresen, Paragon Island, Ventura Verlag (2015), ; Die Paragoninsel, Ventura Verlag (2015), .
  http://www.pirates-corsaires.com/levasseur-la-buse.htm
 Nelson, Laura "Samuel Bellamy and Olivier Levasseur – Two Pirates Just Kickin' Around the Caribbean" in Pirates and Privateers http://www.cindyvallar.com/BellamyLevasseur.html

References

External links

  Biography of Olivier Levasseur

1680 births
1730 deaths
18th-century executions by France
18th-century pirates
Executed French people
Executed people from Nord-Pas-de-Calais
French people executed abroad
French pirates
People executed by France by hanging
People executed for piracy
People from Calais
Undeciphered historical codes and ciphers
Maritime folklore